An encore is an additional performance given by performers after the planned show has ended, usually in response to extended applause from the audience. Multiple encores are not uncommon, and they initially originated spontaneously, when audiences continued to applaud and demand additional performance from the artists after they had left the stage. However, in modern times they are rarely spontaneous and are usually a pre-planned part of the show.

Instrumental concerts
At the end of a concert, if there is prolonged applause, one more relatively short piece may be performed as an encore. In some modern circumstances, encores have come to be expected, and artists often plan their encores. Traditionally, in a concert that has a printed set list for the audience, encores are not listed, even when they are planned. A well-known example is the performance of the Radetzky March and The Blue Danube at the end of the Vienna New Year's Concert by the Vienna Philharmonic Orchestra; neither piece is ever listed in the official program, but they are traditionally played every year.

Opera performances
Beginning in the 18th century, if an aria was strongly applauded, it might be repeated. For example, at the premiere of Mozart's Marriage of Figaro, 1 May 1786, and other early performances, "many pieces were encored, almost doubling the length of each performance".

Restrictions on encores 
For "Figaro", on 9 May 1786 Emperor Joseph II of Austria issued an order limiting encores.

By tradition, some world-class opera houses, such as La Scala and the Metropolitan Opera, officially discourage encores, especially for vocal solos, as encores were associated with less serious performances.

In the mid-19th century, encores were officially banned in northern Italy, since the Austrian-Italian authorities felt they would lead to public disorder. In 1921, encores were forbidden at la Scala (in northern Italy), because the conductor Toscanini felt they would interrupt the pace of the opera and drew attention to individual singers as opposed to the work. Toscanini had, in 1887, been challenged to a duel after stubbornly refusing an aria's encore. Wagner was similarly against encores.

The ban at the Metropolitan was explicit in the printed programs at the beginning of the 20th century, but was nevertheless often broken at the insistence of the audience. Encores at the Met became rarer later in the century.

Popular music
In most circumstances, it has become standard for rock, metal, and pop artists to give an encore; especially in large settings such as stadiums and arenas. It is very common for punk bands to perform an encore when in small venues. Artists often plan their encores in advance, and they are commonly included on the artist's setlist; one common practice is to leave one or more of their most popular songs for an encore. However, encores are usually only performed by the headlining artist, as opening bands almost always have restrictions on how long their set can last, and are prohibited from going over the set time with an encore.

Some artists include their encore as the second half of the concert. For example, the Jamaican reggae musician Bob Marley and his band The Wailers were known to play the concerts of their last two tours in 1979 and 1980 in two halves: after the first half was performed they stopped performing for some minutes to tune their instruments again or to have a break, while the audience was demanding for more.  They continued to play the concert with the "encore" which lasted about an hour. Sometimes they even played one or two additional songs (a "real" encore in the traditional sense, rather than an inevitable performance staged as an encore) after the planned encore. Similarly, former Guided by Voices frontman Robert Pollard generally plays songs from his solo career for the first half of his shows, and then, for the inevitable encore, will play a lengthy selection of Guided by Voices songs, with the two halves generally having roughly equal duration.

In the early days of modern rock music, Elvis Presley never played encores, a practice his manager Col. Tom Parker intended to leave audiences wanting more. The now-famous phrase "Elvis has left the building" was used at the beginning of his career when Presley was not the headliner, followed by a plea for the audience to return to their seats so as to watch those artists following Presley. Once he became a headliner, it was invariably followed by a polite "thank you, and good night", to imply to those present at the concert that there was not going to be an encore.

Jimmy Buffett is known for his intimate second encores at his concerts.  He and his band leave the stage after performing their set and return for a typical encore of usually two songs and band introductions.  Then they leave the stage again and Buffett comes back out on stage by himself for a second encore and performs an acoustic ballad to end the show.  This final song is usually what his hardcore fans look forward to the most because it's a different song every show and usually an obscure selection; many fans consider Buffett's ballads to be his best songs despite not being among his famous songs.  A collection of Buffett's second encores, entitled encores, was released in 2010.

Morphine frontman Mark Sandman sometimes mocked the practice.  At the close of Morphine shows, he would wave and say "Thank you! Good night!", but the band would remain in their places, and the lights would not be dimmed. After several minutes, the band would begin playing again.

Boston played multiple shows with four encores throughout the 1980s.

Both The Cure and Prince have been known to play a large number of songs in their encores, either in a long singular encore or spanning across multiple encores. The encore portions of their sets have sometimes lasted longer than the initial shows themselves. The Cure have played up to five encores on a handful of occasions and Prince has played up to seven.

Etymology
The word encore comes from the French encore , which means ‘again, some more’; however, it is not used this way in French, but it is ancora in Italian. French speakers commonly use instead either une autre (‘another’), un rappel (‘a return, curtain call’) or the Latin bis (‘second time’) in the same circumstances. Italians use bis too. In England, [un']altra volta (Italian for ‘another time’) was used in the early nineteenth century, but such usage had been completely supplanted by 1900.

References

Concerts